Palathinkal Varkey Cherian (or Cheriyan) (9 July 1893 – 9 November 1969) was a physician, surgeon and politician from India. He was the Governor of Maharashtra from 14 November 1964 to 8 November 1969.

Early life and medical career
Cherian was born in Alleppey, Travancore, as the son of Achamma and Magistrate P.M Varkey and to the Anglican Syrian Christian Palathinkal family. After completing schooling in Travancore, Cherian went to Madras in 1912, where he earned his MBBS degree in 1917. He then joined the Government Hospital for Women and Children as an Assistant Surgeon. He was later commissioned to the Indian Medical Service, as part of the 88th Carnatic Infantry and served in various cities in Mesopotamia.

In 1925, Cherian went to the United Kingdom to specialise in ear, nose and throat diseases and, in 1926, passed the FRCS examination from Edinburgh. R. N. Arogyasamy Mudaliar, the Minister for Medical Administration (1926–28), he was keen to "indianise" medical services. So he appointed Cherian the first Indian Superintendent of Madras Medical College. Later, Cherian became Principal of the college and was appointed the first Indian Surgeon General of Madras Presidency.

Political career
After his retirement from the government medical service in 1948, Cherian became increasingly active in politics. He was an alderman of the Corporation of Madras in 1948 and, in 1950, became mayor of the city. His wife, Tara, whom he married in 1935, was elected to this office in 1956, making the Cherians the only couple to have held the office of the Mayor of Madras.

Tara Cherian, who died in November 2000, was the first woman mayor of independent India and was herself a Member of the Legislative Council during M. G. Ramachandran's government. In 1952, Cherian was elected to the Madras Legislative Council and became its Chairman. He was re-elected to both the Council and its chairmanship in 1959.

On 14 November 1964, P. V. Cherian was sworn in as the Governor of Maharashtra. He was a well known figure in that position. As a Christian, he promoted ecumenism. He was the president of the All India Conference of Indian Christians. At the same time, he was a high ranking rotarian and freemason.

In recognition of their services to the Indian Christian community, Dr. Cherian and his wife Tara were vested with the Pontifical Equestrian Order of St. Gregory the Great and the Benemerenti medal respectively, by Pope Paul VI. They are the first non-Catholic Indians to receive such Papal Orders. Tara Cherian was also awarded Padma Bhushan, the third highest civilian honour in India, for her social work. Governor Cherian died in office, on 9 November 1969, at the age of 76.

References

Bibliography 

 
 
 
 
 
 
 

1893 births
1969 deaths
Saint Thomas Christians
Indian Anglicans
20th-century Indian medical doctors
Governors of Maharashtra
Indian Medical Service officers
Indian surgeons
Mayors of Chennai
Medical doctors from Kerala
Tamil Nadu politicians
20th-century surgeons